Quota System can refer to:

Quota System (Royal Navy), a system in place from 1791 to 1815 for manning British naval ships
Reservation in India, quota systems in India favoring lower castes, women, religious minorities, indigenous peoples, and others
Quota Borda system
Racial quota, in hiring minorities
Quotaism
Import quota, in trade regulations
Ticket quota, in police departments